Parhuayane (possibly from Aymara parwaya a plant of the Deyeuxia family, -ni a suffix to indicate ownership, "the one with the parwaya plant") is a mountain in the Chila mountain range in the Andes of Peru, about  high. It is located in the Arequipa Region, Caylloma Province, Madrigal District. Parhuayane lies southeast of Minaspata and Surihuiri.

References

Mountains of Peru
Mountains of Arequipa Region